Amine Bassi (born 27 November 1997) is a professional footballer who plays as a midfielder for MLS club Houston Dynamo. Born in France, he represents Morocco internationally.

Club career

Nancy 
Bassi began his professional career with Nancy, joining from the youth team of Épinal in 2015. He made his professional debut for Nancy in a 3–0 Ligue 1 loss to Monaco on 6 May 2017.

Metz 
On 19 May 2021, he signed a four-year contract with Nancy's rivals Metz, effective from 1 July. On 31 January 2022, Bassi joined EFL Championship side Barnsley on loan for the remainder of the 2021–22 season. He scored his first goals for Barnsley when he scored twice in a 3-2 win over Middlesbrough on 26 February 2022. The loan was terminated on 26 April 2022.

International career
Bassi was born in France and is of Moroccan descent. He made his debut for the Morocco U21s in a friendly 4–0 loss to the Italy U21 on 11 October 2017.

Career statistics

References

External links
 
 
 
 
 ASNL Profile

Living people
1997 births
People from Bezons
Footballers from Val-d'Oise
Association football midfielders
Moroccan footballers
Morocco youth international footballers
French footballers
French sportspeople of Moroccan descent
AS Nancy Lorraine players
FC Metz players
Barnsley F.C. players
Houston Dynamo FC players
Ligue 1 players
Ligue 2 players
Championnat National 2 players
Championnat National 3 players
English Football League players